Richard Hawkes  may refer to:

Richard Hawkes (tennis) (1940–2001), New Zealand judge and tennis player.
Richard Hawkes (politician), MP for Middlesex (UK Parliament constituency)

See also
Richard Hawke, NZ politician